In Walked Buckner is an album by American saxophonist Roscoe Mitchell which was recorded in Chicago in 1998 and released on Delmark the following year. The album is dedicated to vocalist Thomas Buckner.

Reception

In his review for AllMusic,  Michael G. Nastos states "This recording... captures the singing characteristics of Buckner in a purely instrumental way, and quite beautifully. Timbres are rare and off-kilter, free flowing, static, or flat-out swinging. In the middle is Mitchell, carrying the torch that has kept him a vital, adventurous American musician for three decades.  ... They are convincing exhibits of Mitchell's position as perhaps the premier and essential improvised musical voice in the avant-garde of them all. In spirit, execution, and intent, Mitchell succeeds on all levels, except perhaps as a hitmaker. Surely his fans like it that way. Highly recommended to appreciators of this style"

Track listing
All compositions by Roscoe Mitchell
 "Off Shore" – 11:00
 "In Walked Buckner" – 5:52
 "Squeaky" – 7:36
 "The Le Dreher Suite" – 8:55
 "Three Sides of a Story" – 7:19
 "Till Autumn" – 4:00
 "Fly Over" – 11:11
 "Opposite Sides" – 8:24

Personnel
Roscoe Mitchell - piccolo flute, baroque flute, bass recorder, clarinet, soprano saxophone, alto saxophone, small bells, whistles
Jodie Christian – piano, small bells
Reggie Workman – bass, percussion, whistles
Albert "Tootie" Heath – drums, Egyptian flute, didgeridoo, small percussion

References

1999 albums
Roscoe Mitchell albums
Delmark Records albums
Albums produced by Bob Koester